Nasri Maalouf (May 7, 1911 – April 2, 2005) was a Lebanese politician. He was a Melkite Greek Catholic, and was known as a moderate and peacemaker in Lebanese politics.

Nasri Maalouf was also a prominent lawyer, who mediated one of his most important cases, the one involving the prosecution of Nizar Halabi's assassination.

Maalouf was born in al-Mashrah, Beirut, in modern-day Lebanon. He was educated in Syria. He was a signer of the Lebanese constitution and the Taif Accord. He was the Minister of Finance from November 1956 to July 1957.

He was a long-time member of parliament from Beirut- first elected in 1968 alongside Michel Sassine- and served in the cabinet several times, including as foreign minister for a few months in 1992, as well as defense minister from 1973 to 1974, and Minister of Justice. Shortly before his death, he was appointed to be a member of a council of elders which supervised parliamentary elections in June 2005.

References

1911 births
2005 deaths
Lebanese Melkite Greek Catholics
Members of the Parliament of Lebanon
Defense ministers of Lebanon
Finance ministers of Lebanon
Foreign ministers of Lebanon
Politicians from Beirut